The Aspall Tennis Classic at Hurlingham is an exhibition tennis tournament held each year since 1994 on the grass courts at the Hurlingham Club in London, in the week before the Wimbledon Championships. It is managed by IMG.

Previously Novak Djokovic, Carlos Moyá, Rafael Nadal, Marat Safin, James Blake, Richard Gasquet and Tomáš Berdych have appeared as well with a host of 'legends'.

References

Tennis tournaments in England
Exhibition tennis tournaments
Grass court tennis tournaments
Sport in Hammersmith and Fulham